The Public Force of Costa Rica is the Costa Rican national law enforcement force, which performs policing and border patrol functions.

History

On 1 December 1948, President José Figueres Ferrer of Costa Rica abolished the military of Costa Rica after achieving victory in the Costa Rican Civil War that year.

In 1949, the abolition of the military was introduced in Article 12 of the Constitution of Costa Rica. The budget previously dedicated to the military is now dedicated to security, education and culture. Costa Rica maintains Police Guard forces.

Unlike its neighbors, Costa Rica has not endured a civil war since 1948. Costa Rica maintains small forces capable of law enforcement, but has no permanent standing army.

Public Force of the Ministry of Public Security (1996)
They are now under the Ministry and operate on a geographic command basis performing ground security, law enforcement, counter-narcotics, border patrol, and tourism security functions. The Costa Rica Coast Guard also operates directly under the Ministry.

Outside the Fuerza Pública, there is a small Special Forces Unit, the Unidad Especial de Intervencion (UEI) or Special Intervention Unit, an elite commando force which trains with special forces from around the world, but is not part of the main police forces. Instead it is part of the Intelligence and Security Directorate (DIS) which reports directly to the Minister of the Presidency. About 70 members strong, it is organized along military lines, although officially a civilian police unit.

The motto of the Public Force is "God, Fatherland, and Honour." Commissioner of Police Juan José Andrade Morales serves as its current Commissioner General.

Ranks

Equipment
The Public Force has restricted warfare capabilities.

Handguns
 SIG Sauer P226 9×19 mm
 Smith & Wesson Model 5906 9×19 mm
 Beretta M9 9×19 mm
 IWI Jericho 941 9×19 mm
 Taurus PT92 9×19 mm
 Glock 17 9×19 mm

Submachine guns
 Heckler & Koch MP5 9×19 mm

Shotguns
 Benelli M4 12 gauge; 18.5×76 mm
 
Assault rifles
 M16 5.56×45 mm
 M4 5.56×45 mm
 SIG 556 5.56×45 mm
 IMI Galil
 FN FAL 7.62×51 mm
 IWI Tavor 5.56×45 mm

Machine guns 
 M60 machine gun 7.62×51 mm
 IWI Negev 5.56×45 mm
 M2 Browning 12.7×99 mm

Sniper rifles 
 M24 7.62×51 mm
 M21 7.62×51 mm

Grenade launchers 
 M79
 Model 2012Z

See also
 List of countries without armed forces

References

External links
 Fuerza Pública de Costa Rica.
 Ministerio de Seguridad Pública.
 El Espíritu del 48: Abolición del Ejército A brief history of the abolition of the military in Costa Rica.
 

Law enforcement in Costa Rica
Law of Costa Rica